Nilakanta is one of the epithets of the Hindu deity Shiva.

Legend

According to Hindu mythology, Shiva gained this epithet when he consumed the kalakuta (poison) that emerged from Samudra Manthana, which rendered his throat blue.

See also
Rudra
Ishvara
Maheshvara

References

Hindu gods
Names of God in Hinduism
Shaivism